The Stomatol Sign is Sweden's first animated commercial display and the oldest still working. It represents a toothbrush and a toothpaste tube of the Swedish brand Stomatol. It was first erected on November 22, 1909, on the old Katarina Elevator, in the area of Slussenområdet, Stockholm.

References

Brands of toothpaste
Swedish brands
Signage